The 1993–94 NBA season was the Bulls' 28th season in the National Basketball Association. The Bulls entered the season as the three time defending NBA champions, having defeated the Phoenix Suns in the 1993 NBA Finals in six games, winning their third NBA championship, their first of two threepeats in the 1990s. This was the first season without All-Star guard Michael Jordan since the 1983–84 season, as he retired during the off-season to pursue a baseball career after the murder of his father. Instead, the Bulls were led by All-Star forward Scottie Pippen. In the off-season, the team signed free agents Steve Kerr, Bill Wennington, and Pete Myers, who was signed to fill in the void left by Jordan at shooting guard.

The Bulls continued to play solid basketball winning ten straight games in December after an 8–8 start, and later on held a 34–13 record at the All-Star break. At midseason, the team traded Stacey King to the Minnesota Timberwolves in exchange for Australian center Luc Longley. The Bulls posted another 10-game winning streak between March and April finishing second overall in the Central Division, and third overall in the Eastern Conference with a 55–27 record.

Pippen averaged 22.0 points, 8.7 rebounds, 5.6 assists and 2.9 steals per game, and was named to the All-NBA First Team, and NBA All-Defensive First Team. In addition, Horace Grant averaged 15.1 points, 11.0 rebounds and 1.2 blocks per game, and was named to the NBA All-Defensive Second Team, while B. J. Armstrong provided the team with 14.8 points per game, and Croatian rookie forward Toni Kukoč averaged 10.9 points per game, and was named to the NBA All-Rookie Second Team. Kerr contributed 8.6 points per game off the bench, and Myers averaged just 7.9 points per game. Pippen, Grant and Armstrong were all selected to play in the 1994 NBA All-Star Game in Minneapolis, in which Pippen won the All-Star Game MVP award. Pippen also finished in third place in Most Valuable Player voting, and in fourth place in Defensive Player of the Year voting.

However, the Bulls would not be able to win a fourth consecutive NBA championship. After sweeping the Cleveland Cavaliers in three straight games in the Eastern Conference First Round, they would lose in the Eastern Conference Semi-finals of the 1994 NBA Playoffs to the New York Knicks in seven games. The Knicks would reach the NBA Finals, but would lose in seven games to the Houston Rockets. 

This was also the Bulls' last season at Chicago Stadium before moving across the street to the new United Center. Following the season, Grant signed as a free agent with the Orlando Magic, while Bill Cartwright signed with the Seattle SuperSonics, Scott Williams signed with the Philadelphia 76ers, and John Paxson retired.

Off-season

Jordan's retirement
On October 6, 1993, Michael Jordan announced his retirement at age 30, citing a loss in his desire to play the game. Jordan later stated that the murder of his father three months earlier shaped his decision. James R. Jordan, Sr. was murdered on July 23, 1993, at a highway rest area in Lumberton, North Carolina, found in a creek on August 3, murdered by two teenagers, Daniel Green and Larry Martin Demery. The assailants were traced from calls they made on James Jordan's cellular phone, caught, convicted and sentenced to life in prison. Jordan was close to his father; as a child he had imitated his father's proclivity to stick out his tongue while absorbed in work.

Those close to Jordan claimed that he had been considering retirement as early as the summer of 1992, and that the added exhaustion due to the Dream Team run in the 1992 Olympics solidified Jordan's burned-out feelings about the game and his ever-growing celebrity status. Jordan's announcement sent shock waves throughout the NBA and appeared on the front pages of newspapers around the world.

Jordan then further surprised the sports world by signing a minor league baseball contract with the Chicago White Sox. He reported to spring training and was assigned to the team's minor league system on March 31, 1994. Jordan has stated this decision was made to pursue the dream of his late father, who had always envisioned his son as a major league baseball player. The White Sox were another team owned by Bulls owner Jerry Reinsdorf, who continued to honor Jordan's basketball contract during the years he played baseball. He had an unspectacular professional baseball career for the Birmingham Barons, a Chicago White Sox farm team, batting .202 with 3 HR, 51 RBI, 30 SB, and 11 errors. He also appeared for the Scottsdale Scorpions in the 1994 Arizona Fall League.

NBA draft

Roster

Regular season
Most experts did not predict the Bulls to even make the playoffs after winning their third straight championship the season before because of Jordan's departure. But the team, led by Scottie Pippen and an increased role from both Horace Grant and B. J. Armstrong were able to lead the Bulls to a 55-win season, only 2 wins less than the 1992-93 team, which had Jordan. The Bulls finished two games behind the Atlanta Hawks in the Central Division and earned the 3rd seed in the Eastern Conference Playoffs. Pippen and Armstrong were both voted to start in this season's All-Star game, and Grant was also picked as a reserve.

Season standings

Record vs. opponents

Game log

Regular season

|- align="center" bgcolor="#ccffcc"
| 1
| November 5, 1993
| @ Charlotte
| W 124–123 (OT)
| B. J. Armstrong (28)
| Scottie Pippen (16)
| Scottie Pippen (7)
| Charlotte Coliseum23,698
| 1–0
|- align="center" bgcolor="#ffcccc"
| 2
| November 6, 1993
| Miami
| L 71–95
| Scottie Pippen (18)
| Horace Grant (12)
| B. J. Armstrong (3)
| Chicago Stadium18,676
| 1–1
|- align="center" bgcolor="#ccffcc"
| 3
| November 8, 1993
| Atlanta
| W 106–80
| B. J. Armstrong (23)
| Horace Grant (10)
| Pete Myers (7)
| Chicago Stadium18,157
| 2–1
|- align="center" bgcolor="#ccffcc"
| 4
| November 10, 1993
| @ Milwaukee
| W 91–90
| Horace Grant (20)
| Horace Grant (10)
| B. J. Armstrong (5)
| Bradley Center18,633
| 3–1
|- align="center" bgcolor="#ffcccc"
| 5
| November 13, 1993
| Boston
| L 97–98
| B. J. Armstrong (22)
| Horace Grant (10)
| Armstrong, Grant, Kerr (5)
| Chicago Stadium18,676
| 3–2
|- align="center" bgcolor="#ffcccc"
| 6
| November 16, 1993
| @ Seattle
| L 94–95
| Toni Kukoč (20)
| Bill Cartwright (9)
| Pete Myers (4)
| Seattle Center Coliseum14,813
| 3–3
|- align="center" bgcolor="#ffcccc"
| 7
| November 18, 1993
| @ Portland
| L 98–120
|
|
|
| Memorial Coliseum
| 3–4
|- align="center" bgcolor="#ccffcc"
| 8
| November 19, 1993
| @ L.A. Lakers
| W 88–86
|
|
|
| Great Western Forum
| 4–4
|- align="center" bgcolor="#ffcccc"
| 9
| November 21, 1993
| @ Sacramento
| L 101–103
|
|
|
| ARCO Arena
| 4–5
|- align="center" bgcolor="#ffcccc"
| 10
| November 23, 1993
| @ Houston
| L 93–100
|
|
|
| The Summit
| 4–6
|- align="center" bgcolor="#ffcccc"
| 11
| November 24, 1993
| @ San Antonio
| L 84–109
|
|
|
| Alamodome
| 4–7
|- align="center" bgcolor="#ccffcc"
| 12
| November 26, 1993
| @ Dallas
| W 108–85
|
|
|
| Reunion Arena
| 5–7
|- align="center" bgcolor="#ccffcc"
| 13
| November 30, 1993
| Phoenix
| W 132–113
|
|
|
| Chicago Stadium
| 6–7

|- align="center" bgcolor="#ccffcc"
| 14
| December 3, 1993
| @ Miami
| W 104–99
|
|
|
| Miami Arena
| 7–7
|- align="center" bgcolor="#ccffcc"
| 15
| December 7, 1993
| L.A. Clippers
| W 115–111
|
|
|
| Chicago Stadium
| 8–7
|- align="center" bgcolor="#ffcccc"
| 16
| December 8, 1993
| @ Philadelphia
| L 88–95 (OT)
|
|
|
| The Spectrum
| 8–8
|- align="center" bgcolor="#ccffcc"
| 17
| December 10, 1993
| @ New Jersey
| W 109–105
|
|
|
| Brendan Byrne Arena
| 9–8
|- align="center" bgcolor="#ccffcc"
| 18
| December 11, 1993
| Cleveland
| W 93–84
|
|
|
| Chicago Stadium
| 10–8
|- align="center" bgcolor="#ccffcc"
| 19
| December 15, 1993
| @ Boston
| W 108–98
|
|
|
| Boston Garden
| 11–8
|- align="center" bgcolor="#ccffcc"
| 20
| December 17, 1993
| New York
| W 98–86
|
|
|
| Chicago Stadium
| 12–8
|- align="center" bgcolor="#ccffcc"
| 21
| December 18, 1993
| San Antonio
| W 102–90
|
|
|
| Chicago Stadium
| 13–8
|- align="center" bgcolor="#ccffcc"
| 22
| December 20, 1993
| Charlotte
| W 109–97
|
|
|
| Chicago Stadium
| 14–8
|- align="center" bgcolor="#ccffcc"
| 23
| December 22, 1993
| Minnesota
| W 106–98
|
|
|
| Chicago Stadium
| 15–8
|- align="center" bgcolor="#ccffcc"
| 24
| December 23, 1993
| @ Detroit
| W 81–72
|
|
|
| The Palace of Auburn Hills
| 16–8
|- align="center" bgcolor="#ccffcc"
| 25
| December 25, 1993
| Orlando
| W 95–93
|
|
|
| Chicago Stadium
| 17–8
|- align="center" bgcolor="#ccffcc"
| 26
| December 29, 1993
| New Jersey
| W 94–86
|
|
|
| Chicago Stadium
| 18–8
|- align="center" bgcolor="#ffcccc"
| 27
| December 30, 1993
| @ Charlotte
| L 95–115
|
|
|
| Charlotte Coliseum
| 18–9

|- align="center" bgcolor="#ccffcc"
| 28
| January 4, 1994
| Detroit
| W 97–91
|
|
|
| Chicago Stadium
| 19–9
|- align="center" bgcolor="#ffcccc"
| 29
| January 5, 1994
| @ Orlando
| L 90–105
|
|
|
| Orlando Arena
| 19–10
|- align="center" bgcolor="#ccffcc"
| 30
| January 7, 1994
| @ Washington
| W 99–92
|
|
|
| USAir Arena
| 20–10
|- align="center" bgcolor="#ccffcc"
| 31
| January 8, 1994
| Dallas
| W 100–81
|
|
|
| Chicago Stadium
| 21–10
|- align="center" bgcolor="#ffcccc"
| 32
| January 12, 1994
| @ Atlanta
| L 81–92
|
|
|
| The Omni
| 21–11
|- align="center" bgcolor="#ccffcc"
| 33
| January 14, 1994
| Utah
| W 107–91
|
|
|
| Chicago Stadium
| 22–11
|- align="center" bgcolor="#ccffcc"
| 34
| January 15, 1994
| Houston
| W 82–76
|
|
|
| Chicago Stadium
| 23–11
|- align="center" bgcolor="#ccffcc"
| 35
| January 17, 1994
| Philadelphia
| W 121–91
|
|
|
| Chicago Stadium
| 24–11
|- align="center" bgcolor="#ccffcc"
| 36
| January 19, 1994
| Washington
| W 84–83
|
|
|
| Chicago Stadium
| 25–11
|- align="center" bgcolor="#ccffcc"
| 37
| January 21, 1994
| Indiana
| W 96–95
|
|
|
| Chicago Stadium
| 26–11
|- align="center" bgcolor="#ccffcc"
| 38
| January 22, 1994
| @ Indiana
| W 90–81
|
|
|
| Market Square Arena
| 27–11
|- align="center" bgcolor="#ccffcc"
| 39
| January 24, 1994
| @ Detroit
| W 92–86
|
|
|
| The Palace of Auburn Hills
| 28–11
|- align="center" bgcolor="#ffcccc"
| 40
| January 27, 1994
| @ Cleveland
| L 84–100
|
|
|
| Richfield Coliseum
| 28–12
|- align="center" bgcolor="#ccffcc"
| 41
| January 28, 1994
| Milwaukee
| W 113–96
|
|
|
| Chicago Stadium
| 29–12

|- align="center" bgcolor="#ccffcc"
| 42
| February 1, 1994
| @ Denver
| W 118–98
|
|
|
| McNichols Sports Arena
| 30–12
|- align="center" bgcolor="#ccffcc"
| 43
| February 3, 1994
| @ Utah
| W 94–85
|
|
|
| Delta Center
| 31–12
|- align="center" bgcolor="#ccffcc"
| 44
| February 4, 1994
| @ Golden State
| W 101–99
|
|
|
| Oakland-Alameda County Coliseum Arena
| 32–12
|- align="center" bgcolor="#ffcccc"
| 45
| February 6, 1994
| @ Phoenix
| L 88–89
|
|
|
| America West Arena
| 32–13
|- align="center" bgcolor="#ccffcc"
| 46
| February 8, 1994
| @ L.A. Clippers
| W 118–89
|
|
|
| Los Angeles Memorial Sports Arena
| 33–13
|- align="center" bgcolor="#ccffcc"
| 47
| February 10, 1994
| @ Milwaukee
| W 97–80
|
|
|
| Bradley Center
| 34–13
|- align="center"
|colspan="9" bgcolor="#bbcaff"|All-Star Break
|- style="background:#cfc;"
|- bgcolor="#bbffbb"
|- align="center" bgcolor="#ffcccc"
| 48
| February 16, 1994
| Miami
| L 101–109
|
|
|
| Chicago Stadium
| 34–14
|- align="center" bgcolor="#ffcccc"
| 49
| February 18, 1994
| Denver
| L 84–109
|
|
|
| Chicago Stadium
| 34–15
|- align="center" bgcolor="#ffcccc"
| 50
| February 20, 1994
| @ New York
| L 68–86
|
|
|
| Madison Square Garden
| 34–16
|- align="center" bgcolor="#ccffcc"
| 51
| February 21, 1994
| Charlotte
| W 118–93
|
|
|
| Chicago Stadium
| 35–16
|- align="center" bgcolor="#ccffcc"
| 52
| February 23, 1994
| Golden State
| W 123–100
|
|
|
| Chicago Stadium
| 36–16
|- align="center" bgcolor="#ccffcc"
| 53
| February 25, 1994
| @ Washington
| W 114–88
|
|
|
| USAir Arena
| 37–16
|- align="center" bgcolor="#ffcccc"
| 54
| February 26, 1994
| Indiana
| L 86–96
|
|
|
| Chicago Stadium
| 37–17
|- align="center" bgcolor="#ffcccc"
| 55
| February 28, 1994
| Cleveland
| L 81–89
|
|
|
| Chicago Stadium
| 37–18

|- align="center" bgcolor="#ffcccc"
| 56
| March 2, 1994
| L.A. Lakers
| L 89–97
|
|
|
| Chicago Stadium
| 37–19
|- align="center" bgcolor="#ffcccc"
| 57
| March 4, 1994
| Portland
| L 96–115
|
|
|
| Chicago Stadium
| 37–20
|- align="center" bgcolor="#ffcccc"
| 58
| March 6, 1994
| @ Cleveland
| L 95–99
|
|
|
| Richfield Coliseum
| 37–21
|- align="center" bgcolor="#ccffcc"
| 59
| March 8, 1994
| Atlanta
| W 116–95
|
|
|
| Chicago Stadium
| 38–21
|- align="center" bgcolor="#ffcccc"
| 60
| March 11, 1994
| @ Atlanta
| L 77–108
|
|
|
| The Omni
| 38–22
|- align="center" bgcolor="#ccffcc"
| 61
| March 12, 1994
| Sacramento
| W 111–94
|
|
|
| Chicago Stadium
| 39–22
|- align="center" bgcolor="#ccffcc"
| 62
| March 15, 1994
| Orlando
| W 108–98
|
|
|
| Chicago Stadium
| 40–22
|- align="center" bgcolor="#ccffcc"
| 63
| March 16, 1994
| @ Boston
| W 101–100
|
|
|
| Boston Garden
| 41–22
|- align="center" bgcolor="#ccffcc"
| 64
| March 18, 1994
| Seattle
| W 87–84
|
|
|
| Chicago Stadium
| 42–22
|- align="center" bgcolor="#ccffcc"
| 65
| March 20, 1994
| @ Minnesota
| W 90–80
|
|
|
| Target Center
| 43–22
|- align="center" bgcolor="#ffcccc"
| 66
| March 22, 1994
| @ New York
| L 78–87
|
|
|
| Madison Square Garden
| 43–23
|- align="center" bgcolor="#ccffcc"
| 67
| March 23, 1994
| @ Philadelphia
| W 99–87
|
|
|
| The Spectrum
| 44–23
|- align="center" bgcolor="#ffcccc"
| 68
| March 25, 1994
| @ New Jersey
| L 87–110
|
|
|
| Brendan Byrne Arena
| 44–24
|- align="center" bgcolor="#ccffcc"
| 69
| March 26, 1994
| Indiana
| W 90–88
|
|
|
| Chicago Stadium
| 45–24
|- align="center" bgcolor="#ccffcc"
| 70
| March 29, 1994
| Philadelphia
| W 106–103
|
|
|
| Chicago Stadium
| 46–24

|- align="center" bgcolor="#ccffcc"
| 71
| April 1, 1994
| Detroit
| W 102–95
|
|
|
| Chicago Stadium
| 47–24
|- align="center" bgcolor="#ccffcc"
| 72
| April 3, 1994
| @ Detroit
| W 96–93
|
|
|
| The Palace of Auburn Hills
| 48–24
|- align="center" bgcolor="#ccffcc"
| 73
| April 5, 1994
| Washington
| W 114–88
|
|
|
| Chicago Stadium
| 49–24
|- align="center" bgcolor="#ccffcc"
| 74
| April 8, 1994
| @ Indiana
| W 100–94
|
|
|
| Market Square Arena
| 50–24
|- align="center" bgcolor="#ccffcc"
| 75
| April 9, 1994
| Milwaukee
| W 125–99
|
|
|
| Chicago Stadium
| 51–24
|- align="center" bgcolor="#ccffcc"
| 76
| April 12, 1994
| New Jersey
| W 111–105
|
|
|
| Chicago Stadium
| 52–24
|- align="center" bgcolor="#ccffcc"
| 77
| April 13, 1994
| @ Miami
| W 96–90
|
|
|
| Miami Arena
| 53–24
|- align="center" bgcolor="#ccffcc"
| 78
| April 15, 1994
| @ Charlotte
| W 88–85
|
|
|
| Charlotte Coliseum
| 54–24
|- align="center" bgcolor="#ffcccc"
| 79
| April 17, 1994
| @ Orlando
| L 101–118
|
|
|
| Orlando Arena
| 54–25
|- align="center" bgcolor="#ccffcc"
| 80
| April 18, 1994
| Atlanta
| W 87–70
|
|
|
| Chicago Stadium
| 55–25
|- align="center" bgcolor="#ffcccc"
| 81
| April 22, 1994
| Boston
| L 94–104 (2OT)
|
|
|
| Chicago Stadium
| 55–26
|- align="center" bgcolor="#ffcccc"
| 82
| April 24, 1994
| New York
| L 76–92
|
|
|
| Chicago Stadium
| 55–27

Playoffs

|- align="center" bgcolor="#ccffcc"
| 1
| April 29, 1994
| Cleveland
| W 104–96
| Scottie Pippen (31)
| Scottie Pippen (12)
| Peter Myers (6)
| Chicago Stadium18,676
| 1–0
|- align="center" bgcolor="#ccffcc"
| 2
| May 1, 1994
| Cleveland
| W 105–96
| Scottie Pippen (22)
| Horace Grant (12)
| Toni Kukoč (11)
| Chicago Stadium18,676
| 2–0
|- align="center" bgcolor="#ccffcc"
| 3
| May 3, 1994
| @ Cleveland
| W 95–92 (OT)
| Scottie Pippen (23)
| Scottie Pippen (11)
| Scottie Pippen (6)
| Richfield Coliseum17,778
| 3–0
|-

|- align="center" bgcolor="#ffcccc"
| 1
| May 8, 1994
| @ New York
| L 86–90
| Scottie Pippen (24)
| Luc Longley (8)
| Scottie Pippen (7)
| Madison Square Garden19,763
| 0–1
|- align="center" bgcolor="#ffcccc"
| 2
| May 11, 1994
| @ New York
| L 91–96
| Grant, Armstrong (23)
| Bill Cartwright (10)
| B. J. Armstrong (6)
| Madison Square Garden19,763
| 0–2
|- align="center" bgcolor="#ccffcc"
| 3
| May 13, 1994
| New York
| W 104–102
| Scottie Pippen (25)
| Horace Grant (8)
| Horace Grant (6)
| Chicago Stadium18,676
| 1–2
|- align="center" bgcolor="#ccffcc"
| 4
| May 15, 1994
| New York
| W 95–83
| Scottie Pippen (25)
| Scottie Pippen (8)
| Pippen, Kukoč (6)
| Chicago Stadium18,676
| 2–2
|- align="center" bgcolor="#ffcccc"
| 5
| May 18, 1994
| @ New York
| L 86–87
| Scottie Pippen (23)
| three players tied (6)
| three players tied (4)
| Madison Square Garden19,763
| 2–3
|- align="center" bgcolor="#ccffcc"
| 6
| May 20, 1994
| New York
| W 93–79
| B. J. Armstrong (20)
| Horace Grant (12)
| Scottie Pippen (6)
| Chicago Stadium18,676
| 3–3
|- align="center" bgcolor="#ffcccc"
| 7
| May 22, 1994
| @ New York
| L 77–87
| Scottie Pippen (20)
| Scottie Pippen (16)
| Scottie Pippen (5)
| Madison Square Garden19,763
| 3–4
|-

Player statistics

NOTE: Please write the players statistics in alphabetical order by last name.

Season

Playoffs

Awards and records
 Scottie Pippen, NBA All-Star Game Most Valuable Player Award
 Scottie Pippen, All-NBA First Team
 Scottie Pippen, NBA All-Defensive First Team
 Horace Grant, NBA All-Defensive Second Team
 Toni Kukoč, NBA All-Rookie Team 2nd Team

NBA All-Star Game
 Scottie Pippen
 B. J. Armstrong
 Horace Grant

Transactions

References

 Bulls on Database Basketball
 Bulls on Basketball Reference

Chicago Bulls seasons
Chic
Chicago
Chicago